Roztoki Dolne  (Roztoky Dolishni) is a village in the administrative district of Gmina Baligród, within Lesko County, Podkarpackie Voivodeship, in south-eastern Poland.

References

Roztoki Dolne